Opharus rema is a moth of the family Erebidae. It was described by Paul Dognin in 1891. It is found in Santa Catarina, Brazil.

References

Opharus
Moths described in 1891
Moths of South America